Hey's Mineral Index is a standard reference work in mineralogy.  

It is an alphabetical index of known mineral species and varieties, and includes synonyms.  For species and major varieties more detail is provided.  It includes a classification of minerals based on their chemistry into 32 top-level groups, and breaks these groups down further.

Editions
 First edition, An Index of Mineral Species & Varieties Arranged Chemically, With An Alphabetical Index of Accepted Mineral Names and Synonyms by Max Hutchinson Hey, published by order of the British Library, was published in 1950.
 Second edition by Max Hutchinson Hey was published in 1962.
 Third edition by Andrew M. Clark was published in 1993.
 Fourth edition by Andrew M. Clark due for publication in 2004 but was never released.

See also
Nickel–Strunz classification

References

Reference works
Geology books
Mineralogy